{{DISPLAYTITLE:C10H15N3O5}}
The molecular formula C10H15N3O5 (molar mass: 257.24 g/mol, exact mass: 257.1012 u) may refer to:

 Benserazide
 5-Methylcytidine